The 116th district of the Texas House of Representatives contains parts of central San Antonio. The current Representative is Trey Martinez Fischer, who was first elected in 2018.

References 

116